Lough Anaserd is a freshwater lake in the west of Ireland. It is located in west County Galway on the Slyne Head peninsula.

Geography and hydrology
The lake has numerous rocky islands and is oligotrophic.

Natural history
Lough Anaserd is home to the slender naiad (Najas flexilis), a rare plant species. The lake is part of the Slyne Head Peninsula Special Area of Conservation.

See also
List of loughs in Ireland

References

Anaserd